Lauri Antero Johannes Mertaranta (born 17 January 1956 in Hyvinkää, Finland) is a prominent Finnish sportscaster and TV personality and former elementary school teacher.

Antero Mertaranta is best known for his energetic announcing in IIHF World Championships ice hockey games, especially when Finland's team is playing. Besides ice hockey Mertaranta has also been announcing football, athletics and Finnish baseball. Mertaranta himself played Finnish baseball in his youth.

In 2001 Mertaranta began hosting a sports quiz show named Se on siinä, named after one of his most famous catchphrases: Se on siinä! (That's it! / That was it! / There it is!).

Before his sportsreporter career Mertaranta worked as a music teacher and fireman. He plays drums in a band called Anza Mertaranta Allstars. The band planned for an album release in 2005 but is yet to release its debut album.

Highlights
 Announced the Finnish broadcast of FIFA World Cup 1994 final
 Announced the Finnish broadcast of FIFA World Cup 1998 final
 Has announced the Finnish broadcast of IIHF Ice Hockey World Championships finals from 1995 and counting in Yle.
 Has announced the Finnish broadcast of IIHF Ice Hockey World Championships finals from 2011 and counting.
 Has announced the Finnish broadcast of IIHF Ice Hockey World Championships finals from 2019 and counting in C More Sport and MTV3.
 Has recorded two smash hit records. Ihanaa Leijonat, Ihanaa (with A-Tyyppi) in 1999 and Pedon Ulvontaa in 2003.

Discography

Albums
2004: Nopea rakastumaan (album by Anza Mertaranta Allstars)
2009: Jytää, poppia ja rautalankaa (album by Anza Mertaranta Allstars)

Singles
1999: "Ihanaa Leijonat, Ihanaa!"
2010: "Sinistä ja vihreää" (single by Anza Mertaranta Allstars)
2011: "Taivas varjele!" (single by Finnish Hockey Mafia feat. Antero Mertaranta)

External links
 New York Times - The Danny Gallivan of Finland

1956 births
People from Hyvinkää
Finnish sports broadcasters
Living people
Finnish television presenters